Thomas George Cranston (1877 – 15 April 1954), was an Irish chess player, two-times Irish Chess Championship winner (1922, 1931).

Biography
From the begin 1920s to the end of 1930s Thomas George Cranston was one of the strongest Irish chess players. He sixth times participated in Irish Chess Championships (1922, 1924, 1925, 1931, 1932, 1938) and two times won this tournament (1922, 1931).

Thomas George Cranston played for Ireland in the Chess Olympiad:
 In 1935, at fourth board in the 6th Chess Olympiad in Warsaw (+0, =3, -14).

References

External links

Thomas George Cranston chess games at 365chess.com

1877 births
1954 deaths
Irish chess players
Chess Olympiad competitors